California's 17th State Senate district is one of 40 California State Senate districts. It is currently represented by Democrat John Laird of Santa Cruz.

District profile 
The district encompasses the Central Coast, including the coastal Monterey Bay Area, as well as the extreme southern parts of the San Francisco Bay Area.

Monterey County – 45.8%
 Carmel
 Del Rey Oaks
 Marina
 Monterey
 Pacific Grove
 Sand City
 Seaside

All of San Luis Obispo County
 Arroyo Grande
 Atascadero
 Grover Beach
 Morro Bay
 Paso Robles
 Pismo Beach
 San Luis Obispo

Santa Clara County – 11.7%
 Gilroy
 Morgan Hill
 San Jose – 10.5%

All of Santa Cruz County
 Capitola
 Santa Cruz
 Scotts Valley
 Watsonville

Election results from statewide races

List of senators 
Due to redistricting, the 17th district has been moved around different parts of the state. The current iteration resulted from the 2011 redistricting by the California Citizens Redistricting Commission.

Election results 1992 - present

2020

2016

2012

2011 (special)

2008

2004

2000

1996

1992

See also 
 California State Senate
 California State Senate districts
 Districts in California

References

External links 
 District map from the California Citizens Redistricting Commission

17
Government of Monterey County, California
Government of San Luis Obispo County, California
Government of Santa Clara County, California
Government of Santa Cruz County, California
Aptos, California
Arroyo Grande, California
Atascadero, California
Cambria, California
Carmel-by-the-Sea, California
Gilroy, California
Monterey, California
Morgan Hill, California
Morro Bay
Pacific Grove, California
Paso Robles, California
San Luis Obispo, California
San Jose, California
Santa Cruz, California
Watsonville, California
Government in the San Francisco Bay Area